Bonneville National Forest was established by the U.S. Forest Service in Wyoming on July 1, 1908  with  from part of Yellowstone National Forest.  On July 1, 1917 the entire forest was transferred to Washakie National Forest and the name was discontinued.

References

External links
Forest History Society
Forest History Society:Listing of the National Forests of the United States Text from Davis, Richard C., ed. Encyclopedia of American Forest and Conservation History. New York: Macmillan Publishing Company for the Forest History Society, 1983. Vol. II, pp. 743-788.

Former National Forests of Wyoming